The Neon Ceiling is a 1971 American television film starring Gig Young and Lee Grant that aired on NBC Monday Night at the Movies. It was written by Carol Sobieski and directed by Frank Pierson. The film score was composed by Billy Goldenberg.

Plot 
An unhappy housewife takes her precocious teenage daughter and leaves their suburban home in the middle of the night, stopping at a lonely diner in the California desert when her 1960 Ford Galaxie runs into car trouble. She runs up against, and eventually befriends, the diner's owner, a gruff, beer-drinking mechanic and artist whose life's work are the neon sculptures he creates and attaches to the ceiling.

Cast
Gig Young as the diner owner
Lee Grant as the housewife
Denise Nickerson as the daughter
William Smithers as the husband

Production
Lee Grant was set to appear in a TV film of The Price with George C. Scott when Universal sent her the script. "The moment I read that script I was hooked and couldn't let it go", she said. "It's a real departure from what is normally seen on TV."

Reception
The Los Angeles Times called it "an extraordinary experience... a work of art."

For her performance, Lee Grant won the 1971 Emmy Award for Outstanding Single Performance by an Actress in a Leading Role (she was also nominated in the same category for an episode of Columbo.)

References

External links

1971 television films
1971 films
American television films
Films directed by Frank Pierson
Films scored by Billy Goldenberg